Jonas Brothers is the second studio album and the international debut album released by the Jonas Brothers and their first album to be released under Hollywood Records. The album was released on August 7, 2007. "Hold On" was the album's second single, followed by "S.O.S" as the third single, and "When You Look Me in the Eyes" as the fourth single.

Singles

"Year 3000", a cover of a song by the British band Busted, serviced as the lead single from Jonas Brothers. Previously released in 2006 by Columbia from the album It's About Time, "Year 3000" was re-released by Hollywood Records on March 12, 2007. The song peaked at number 31 on the Billboard Hot 100 and sold 1,050,000 copies. "Hold On" was the official second single from the album and was released on May 22, 2007. It was featured in the Disney Channel Original Movie Johnny Kapahala: Back on Board,  and a music video was released to promote the film. "S.O.S" was the album's third single and was released on August 3, 2007. It was the most successful single from the album, peaking at No. 47 in Australia on the ARIA Singles Chart, No. 49 on the Canadian Hot 100, No. 13 on the UK Singles Chart and No. 19 on the US Billboard Hot 100. It was their first single to chart in Canada and the UK. It was their first top-twenty hit in the United States. "When You Look Me in the Eyes" was the album's final single, released on December 28 and produced by John Fields. It was a re-recording of the version that initially appeared on Nick's self-titled solo album. It marked their third chart performance in Australia (No. 46 on the ARIA Singles Chart), their second in Canada and the UK (No. 30 on both the Canadian Hot 100 and the UK Singles Chart), and their fourth in the United States (No. 25 on the Billboard Hot 100, and their third top-40 song).

"Kids of the Future" was released as a single for the soundtrack to the 2007 animated motion picture Meet the Robinsons and later included in the Jonas Brothers' debut album.

Reception

Stephen Thomas Erlewine of AllMusic described the band,"they're cheerful, good-natured, and, best of all, tuneful," going on to say about the album, "It all adds up an album that's tighter and better than their debut, and one that suggests that they not only deserve their popularity on Radio Disney, but they might have the writing and performing skills to last beyond that as well." Cross Rhythms praised the album saying, "Jonas Brothers have delivered an album that's high-energy pop-punk overflowing with catchy hooks and muscular guitar licks."

Commercial performance
Jonas Brothers debuted at number five on the US Billboard 200 with 69,000 copies, becoming the Jonas Brothers' first top 10 album in the country. As of March 2015, the album has sold 2,409,000 million copies in the United States, becoming Jonas' best-selling album to date.

Track listing

Bonus Jonas Edition DVD

Jonas Brothers: The Bonus Jonas Edition includes a DVD containing:
 Full concert performance at the Blender Theatre at Gramercy
 "Kids of the Future"
 "Just Friends"
 "S.O.S"
 "Goodnight & Goodbye"
 "Hello Beautiful"
 "Australia"
 "That's Just the Way We Roll"
 "Hollywood"
 "Inseparable"
 "Still in Love with You"
 "Hold On"
 "Year 3000"

 Music videos
 "S.O.S"
 "Hold On"
 "Kids of the Future" (Live at the 2007 Disney Channel Games closing ceremony)
 "Year 3000"
<small>Total running time: approximately 55 minutes</small>

Woolworths exclusive DVD (UK)

An exclusive DVD containing:
Music videos
 "S.O.S"
 "Hold On"
 "When You Look Me in the Eyes"Band in a Bus'' trailer
"Jonas Brothers Meet The Queen" - Video from the Jonas Brother's YouTube channel

Personnel
 Nick Jonas – lead vocals, rhythm guitar, keyboards, drums on "Australia"
 Joe Jonas – lead vocals
 Kevin Jonas – lead guitar, background vocals
 John Taylor – rhythm and lead guitar, background vocals
 John Fields – Producer, bass guitar, additional keyboards and guitar
 Dorian Crozier – drums, percussion, programming
 Stephen Lu – string arrangements, conducting
 Chris Lord-Alge - Mixing

Charts

Year-end charts

Certifications and sales

Release history

References

External links

2007 albums
Hollywood Records albums
Jonas Brothers albums
Albums produced by John Fields (record producer)